The Bosnia and Herzegovina women's national under-19 football team represents Bosnia and Herzegovina in international football in under-19 categories and is controlled by the Football Association of Bosnia and Herzegovina.

Competitive record

UEFA Women's U19 Championship record

UEFA Women's U19 Championship Qualifications

2017/2018

Group 11

2016/2017

Group 7

Current squad
The following players were called up for 2017 UEFA Women's Under-19 Championship qualification.

Results and schedule

Goalscorers 2013

The box below, shows the results of all matches played in 2012, and the scheduled matches in the near future.

See also
 Bosnia and Herzegovina women's national football team
 Bosnia and Herzegovina women's national under-17 football team
 Football Association of Bosnia and Herzegovina
 UEFA Women's Championship
 UEFA Women's Under-19 Championship
 FIFA U-20 Women's World Cup

External links
 Bosnia and Herzegovina women's national under-19 football team at UEFA.com

Women's national under-19 association football teams
under
European women's national under-19 association football teams